RoboCoaster Ltd is an amusement ride design firm based in Warwickshire, England. Through partnerships with KUKA and Dynamic Attractions, RoboCoaster has installed its namesake products at locations around the world.

History
In December 2000, RoboCoaster Ltd was founded with the goal of integrating robotic technology into the entertainment and leisure industry. In the company's first year of operation, Gino Daniel De-Gol invented the concept of a robotic-arm-based amusement ride. In December 2001, a partnership with German robotic arm manufacturer KUKA saw the patenting and manufacturing of the initial Robocoaster G1 design. In 2004, RoboCoaster partnered with AMEC Dynamic Structures (now Dynamic Attractions) to develop the RoboCoaster G2 system, which utilises track-mounted KUKA arms.

RoboCoaster's partnership with KUKA has also seen robotic arms integrated into films, including Die Another Day, The Da Vinci Code, and Lara Croft Tomb Raider: The Cradle of Life.

In 2015, The British Growth Fund invested £4.5M in a company called Simworx, a media based attraction manufacturer, allowing them to acquire RoboCoaster and boost their working capital as well as buying out their previous private equity investor.

Ride systems

 RoboCoaster G1 – the original RoboCoaster design, where pairs of riders are attached to a stationary KUKA arm. From 2014, four-seater vehicles from the G2 series will be offered in stationary form for smaller family entertainment centers.
 RoboCoaster G2 – the second generation of robotic product, where four-seater KUKA robotic arms run along a two-dimensional track throughout a show building. The track is designed by Dynamic Attractions.
 RoboCoaster G3 – a conceptual third generation of the technology, where trains of four-seater KUKA robotic arms run along a traditional three-dimensional roller coaster track.
 AGVs – automated guided vehicles for trackless dark rides developed with Dynamic Attractions.
 Motion Theatre – a flight simulator where rows of riders are elevated in front of a large dome screen. The attraction is developed with Dynamic Attractions, who has previously developed the ride system for the Soarin' rides at Disney parks.
 HSA – high-speed amphibious vehicles developed with Gibbs Sport Amphibians Inc. of the United Kingdom.

Installations

As of 2012, over 200 individual RoboCoasters have been installed, including some travelling models.

References

External links

 

Amusement ride manufacturers
Design companies established in 2000
Manufacturing companies established in 2000
Companies based in Warwickshire